Aankhen (The Eye) is an Indian television drama series premiered on DD National in 2001. It was directed by Amrit Sagar and Shakti Sagar and produced by Jyoti Sagar.

Plot 

J.K. Malhotra is the governor designated for  Kashmir. Pakistan wants to assassinate him and they enter into a contract with notorious killer Carlos to kill Mr. J.K. Malhotra. The Ankhen team under the leadership of Col. Dhyanchand succeeds in spoiling the evil designs of Carlos and save the life of Malhotra.

Carlos is infuriated by his failure. He vows to take revenge with the Ankhen team and designs a new conspiracy- to blow up a bomb at the venue of the impending peace conference of the foreign advisors in India. Thereby the reputation of India will be adversely affected and the other countries will look at India with hostility. Thus India will be separated from other countries. In order to achieve his mission- Carlos asks his counterpart Ms. Monica and Thomson to reach India.

But the secret agents of Ankhen detect the conspiracy and Col. Dhyanchand is alerted of the same and once again team of Ankhen prepares themselves to face the situation and saves India.

Cast 
Arvind Rouseria as Colonel Dhyanchand
Sanjeev Willson as Carlos
Dharma as Kangaroo
Ankit as Ankhen team member
Arvind as Ankhen team member
Sagar Saini as Anil 
Jyotin Dave is in various roles
Seema Shinde

References

External links 
 

Serial drama television series
2001 Indian television series debuts
DD National original programming
Indian drama television series